Willi Alfred Sawall (born 7 November 1941) is a retired male race walker from Australia. He set his personal best (3:46.34) in the men's 50 km in 1980. Sawall is a seven-time national champion in race walking.

Achievements

External links

1941 births
Living people
Australian male racewalkers
Athletes (track and field) at the 1978 Commonwealth Games
Athletes (track and field) at the 1982 Commonwealth Games
Athletes (track and field) at the 1980 Summer Olympics
Athletes (track and field) at the 1984 Summer Olympics
Olympic athletes of Australia
Commonwealth Games silver medallists for Australia
Commonwealth Games medallists in athletics
Australian masters athletes
Medallists at the 1978 Commonwealth Games